Front of the Class is a 2008 American docudrama film directed by Peter Werner that is based on the 2005 book Front of the Class: How Tourette Syndrome Made Me the Teacher I Never Had by Brad Cohen and co-authored by Lisa Wysocky, which tells of Cohen's life with Tourette syndrome and how it inspired him to teach other students.

The book was made into a Hallmark Hall of Fame TV movie starring newcomer James Wolk—a 2007 University of Michigan graduate—and featuring Treat Williams and Emmy Award-winning actress Patricia Heaton as Cohen's parents; the movie aired on CBS on December 7, 2008.

Synopsis
Brad Cohen's story starts when he is a young boy and his mother helps doctors to realize that he has Tourette syndrome. With the support from his mother and school principal, Brad is a success story, becoming a motivational speaker and an award-winning teacher.

Plot
Twelve-year-old Brad lives in Missouri with his divorcée mother, Ellen, and younger brother, Jeff. He constantly gets into trouble with his father Norman and his teachers at school due to his tics. In one class, his teacher calls him to the front to make him apologize to his class for disrupting the class and promise he won't do it again. Determined to find out what is wrong with her son, Ellen seeks medical help. A psychiatrist believes that Brad's tics are the result of his parents' divorce. One lady suggests an exorcism. Ellen takes her search to the library and comes across Tourette syndrome (TS) in a medical book. She shows this to the psychiatrist, who agrees with the diagnosis, and says that there is no cure. Brad and his mother attend a support group for the first and last time. From then on, Brad aspires to never be like the other members of the support group and to become successful.

At the beginning of middle school, Brad is sent to the principal's office for being disruptive. The principal invites him to the school concert later in the afternoon. At the end of the concert, which Brad's Tourette's tics had disturbed, he calls Brad up to the stage and asks Brad to talk about his TS. As Brad makes his way back to his seat, the school applauds him. For the first time, someone outside his family has given him support and proactively helped him into being accepted by others. From that moment on, Brad has a dream that he will carry on: to become a teacher, just like the principal.

As an adult, Brad lives with his house mate Ron in Georgia, and is looking for work as an elementary school teacher. He is turned down after 24 interviews because of his TS. He finally gets an interview where the staff is accepting and they give him the job.

On his first day, Brad explains his TS to the children. He helps a child with ADHD, Thomas, with reading and makes an impression on Heather, a girl with terminal cancer. Another student's father pulls her out of Brad's class as he fears Brad will distract her. When the little girl tries to sneak in Brad's class again, he express his gratefulness, but doesn't oppose the girl's father wishes and reminds her that her father is doing what he thinks it is best for her.

Brad meets Nancy on an online dating site.  After dating her for some time, he invites her over for Thanksgiving back at Ellen's house, where he tells Nancy he loves her, and the feeling is reciprocated. He confides in Ellen his concern that Nancy will get fed up with his tics, but she reassures him that he must not let his TS get in the way.

An observer at the school assesses Brad's teaching, and the head teacher announces that Brad has been chosen to receive the Teacher of the Year award, which he accepts in front his family, friends and students. The ending titles tell that Brad got his master's degree; he dressed up as Homer, (Atlanta Braves) mascot; he married Nancy in 2006; and a photograph of the real Brad Cohen teaching his class is shown.

Cast 
From IMDB:

 James Wolk as Brad Cohen
 Dominic Scott Kay as young Brad Cohen
 Treat Williams as Norman Cohen; Brad's father
 Patricia Heaton as Ellen Cohen; Brad's mother
 Johnny Pacar as Jeff Cohen; Brad's younger brother
 Charles Henry Wyson as young Jeff Cohen
 Sarah Drew as Nancy Keene; Brad's girlfriend. Based on Cohen's real life wife Nancy Lazarus
 Charlie Finn as Ron; Brad's roommate
 Kathleen York as Diane Cohen; Brad's stepmother and Norman's second wife
 Joe Chrest as Jim Ovbey
 Mike Pniewski as Principal Myer
 Katherine Shepler as Heather; one of Brad's students who dies of cancer
 Zack Miller as Thomas; a trouble student in Brad's class
 Anna Rappaport as Amanda; a former student's of Brad's whose father takes her out of his class because of his Tourette's
 Ashley Young as student #3; one of Brad’s students who is friends with Heather

Production
The script was adapted from the book by Brad Cohen, and the movie was directed by Peter Werner. Production was in Shreveport, Louisiana.

Following his 2006 appearance on The Oprah Winfrey Show, in 2007 Cohen spoke at a conference after Timothy Shriver of the Special Olympics. According to Shriver, "The audience 'was laughing, then crying, then laughing, then crying, then cheering, and at the end, they gave him a huge standing ovation.'" Shriver suggested the movie to Cohen, and became the executive producer one year later.

To portray Cohen's tics accurately, Wolk and Kay viewed videotapes and worked with a dialect coach, describing their preparation as a "Tourette's boot camp". Cohen said the portrayal of his tics is "very, very authentic". Heaton, the mother of four children, was attracted to the script because she related to the strong mother: "Finally, she went to the library herself—as mothers will do to fight to the end for their kids and find out what's wrong—and realized he had Tourettes," Heaton explained.

Although tics steadily decline for most children as they pass through adolescence, Cohen still has frequent and loud vocal tics and barking. He joked:  "I'm hoping I don't get kicked out of my own movie."

Release
The movie was released on DVD in January 2009. A signed copy by author Brad Cohen was also released on DVD.

Reception
Cohen was concerned that the movie should stay truthful and avoid sensationalizing Tourette syndrome. He was pleased with the overall result, although he noted some dates in his life were sped up for effect (for example, the date of his wedding).

See also
 Hichki

References

External links
 
 Brad Cohen Official Website

Films about disability
2008 television films
2008 films
Films based on non-fiction books
American biographical films
CBS network films
Films about educators
Films about Tourette syndrome
Hallmark Hall of Fame episodes
Films directed by Peter Werner
2000s English-language films
2000s American films